Stevenson Glacier is a glacier flowing northwest into the eastern side of the Amery Ice Shelf, just north of Branstetter Rocks. Delineated in 1952 by John H. Roscoe from air photos taken by U.S. Navy Operation Highjump (1946–47), and named by him for Lieutenant James C. Stevenson, co-pilot on Operation Highjump photographic flights in the area.

See also
 List of glaciers in the Antarctic
 Glaciology

References

Glaciers of Ingrid Christensen Coast